United States Coast Guard Station Merrimack River is a United States Coast Guard station located in Newburyport, Massachusetts. It is one of the 20 surf stations in the Coast Guard. Its primary missions include search and rescue and law enforcement.  

The stations current complement is roughly 30 personnel, two 47-foot Motor lifeboats, and a 29-foot response boat-small.   

As of 2021, the station is commanded by a Master Chief Boatswains Mate, and encompasses solely enlisted personnel.  It is staffed at all times by a search and rescue/law enforcement team that is capable of responding to maritime emergencies in nearly all weather conditions.

See also
List of military installations in Massachusetts

External links
Newburyport LSS

Buildings and structures in Essex County, Massachusetts
United States Coast Guard stations
Military installations in Massachusetts
1973 establishments in Massachusetts